Doomsday is a supervillain appearing in American comic books published by DC Comics, commonly as one of Superman's deadliest foes, as well as a major adversary of the Justice League. Created by writer-artist Dan Jurgens, the character had a cameo appearance in Superman: The Man of Steel #17 (November 1992) and made his first full appearance in Superman: The Man of Steel #18 (December 1992).

Doomsday ranked as #46 on IGN's list of the Top 100 Comic Book Villains of All Time. He is best known as the character that killed Superman in The Death of Superman story arc "Doomsday!". He appears in the film Batman v Superman: Dawn of Justice, where he was portrayed by Robin Atkin Downes through voice acting and motion capture.

Publication history 

Doomsday was conceived in 1991 during an annual brainstorming session with the editors and writers of Superman comics, in response to a concern by some writers that most of Superman's foes at this point either relied on technology or their intellect to outmaneuver Superman or had some natural advantage against him, wanting to create a new foe with great physical power to match him. Several writers proposed having Superman die at the hands of a "bestial foe", and editor Mike Carlin scribbled this idea on the wall chart as "doomsday for Superman". Inspired, they chose "Doomsday" as the name for this villain.

Doomsday had a cameo appearance in Superman: The Man of Steel #17 (November 1992) and made his first full appearance in Superman: The Man of Steel #18 (December 1992).

Fictional character biography 
Doomsday is depicted as a monstrous genetically engineered being from the depths of prehistoric Krypton. His creator imbued him with few feelings, mostly hate and desire for destruction, which led to his destroying worlds and eventually finding Earth, where he met Superman. The character is best known as Superman's murderer in the 1992 storyline, "The Death of Superman".

The Ultimate Killing Machine 
Originally known as "The Ultimate", Doomsday was born in prehistoric times on Krypton, long before the humanoid Kryptonian race gained dominance over the planet about 250,000 years ago. It was at that time a violent, hellish world, where only the absolute strongest of creatures could survive. In a cruel experiment involving evolution, intended to create the perfect living being, the alien scientist Bertron released a humanoid infant (born in vitro in a lab) onto the surface of the planet, where he was promptly killed by the harsh environment. The baby's remains were collected and used to clone a stronger version. This process was repeated over and over for decades as a form of accelerated natural evolution. The agony of these repeated deaths was recorded in his genes, driving the creature insane and to hate all life.

As it evolved, the child eventually became able to survive the high temperatures and searing atmosphere, only to be quickly slain by the vicious predators that inhabited the planet. Over time, and without the assistance of Bertron's technology, he gained the ability to thrive on solar energy without the need for food or air, to return to life and adapt to overcome whatever had previously killed him. The Ultimate hunted and exterminated the dangerous predators of Krypton. He then killed Bertron, whom he had come to identify as an enemy.

The Ultimate escaped Krypton via a ship that regularly arrived to deliver supplies to Bertron (who had wanted little contact with the planet's natives) and went on a killing spree across several planets. It began 245,000 years earlier on planet Bylan 5, where Apokoliptian prince Uxas (the future Darkseid) was about to wed a princess (to obtain that planet's chemical deposits for Apokolips's weapons factories). The Ultimate killed Uxas' ally Master Mayhem almost instantly and instilled great fear in Uxas, having watched their fight. Just as the Ultimate and Uxas were about to meet in combat, Uxas was forced to flee; the Ultimate's rampage had caused the planet's atmosphere to become toxic, thereby rendering the chemicals worthless to Apokolips. The Ultimate hitched a ride on an escaping shuttle, which crashed on Khundia. The warring Khundian clans united to build protective armor for a warrior named Kobald, who they hoped would survive long enough to force the Ultimate onto a rocket. Once the rocket was in space, the Ultimate killed Kobald and the resulting explosion sent him hurtling through space.

He next crossed paths with a Green Lantern named Zharan Pel, beating him to death. The Ultimate took the Lantern's power ring and, sensing the power of the Guardians of the Universe, headed towards them. The thousands of Green Lanterns that were sent to stop him were slaughtered. He continued to Oa, where a single Guardian fought him. Wary of the others joining the fight, fearing the Ultimate would absorb their powers as he believed was happening to his powers, he, as a last resort, sacrificed himself in battle to defeat him. The release of energies by the Guardian caused a tear in space through which the Ultimate fell.

Eventually arriving on the planet Calaton, he ravaged that world for three years. With only the capital city left, the royal family combined their life forces into a single energy being, the Radiant. The Radiant killed the Ultimate with a huge blast of energy, laying waste to over a fifth of his planet in the process. In common Calatonian burial procedures, the Ultimate's seemingly dead body was suited and shackled to prevent his spirit from escaping into the afterlife, and he was shot into space because the murders he committed made him unworthy of burial on Calaton. Eventually, his metallic casket crashed on Earth, the force of the impact driving it deep underground.

The Death of Superman 

After freeing one arm and breaking out of his buried vault, The Ultimate went on a rampage in Midwestern America, where he first encountered the Justice League. He defeated the entire team of superheroes in a matter of minutes, which attracted the attention of Superman. Most notable is that the creature fought the whole time literally with one hand tied behind his back (due to his ancient burial cables), yet was still able to lay waste to all opposition and much of the surrounding area. The only Justice Leaguer who could defend herself against the creature was Maxima. The creature gained its new name when League member Booster Gold remarked that the rampage resembled "the arrival of Doomsday". The comment reached the broadcast media and led to the creature becoming known by its new name of Doomsday. Five Leaguers, including Superman, combined their energy powers to take down Doomsday, but succeeded only in destroying the last of his burial cables, allowing him to use both hands, thus worsening the crisis.

During his rampage, Doomsday's interest was captured by billboards and television spots advertising violent wrestling competitions held in Metropolis, which appealed to his blood lust and enticed the otherwise mindless creature to head towards the city. In counterattacking the creature, Superman found that his opponent's power was more than a match for his own and was getting stronger. He realized that if Doomsday actually reached Metropolis, the resulting battle could conceivably destroy the city and kill millions of innocent people. Doomsday developed a strong desire to murder Superman, a desire that was later explained in the Hunter/Prey miniseries: "from the agony of continually dying during his creation process, Doomsday developed in his genes the ability to sense anyone Kryptonian, as well as an overriding instinct to treat any such being as an automatic threat".

In the space of a few issues of the Superman comic book series, Doomsday battled Superman in a titanic struggle, leading the hero to conclude that the creature would continue to attack relentlessly and endlessly, with no fear or compassion. Matters came to a head in Superman (vol. 2) #75, wherein both Doomsday and Superman beat each other to death in front of the Daily Planet building in Metropolis.

Following the battle, four super-beings appeared and took up Superman's mantle, two of them declaring themselves to be the real Superman. One was a half-man/half-machine who greatly resembled Superman with cybernetic implants where Superman had sustained the greatest amount of damage from Doomsday's blows. This "Superman" took custody of Doomsday's body. After strapping the body to an asteroid with an electronic device attached, the cyborg flung Doomsday into deep space on a trajectory supposedly certain to never intersect any other planet. The issue ended with a panel of a reawakened and laughing Doomsday, still chained to the asteroid but otherwise alive.

Rematch: Hunter/Prey 
After passing through a wormhole, Doomsday's asteroid was found by a deep-space scavenger ship. Upon examination of the peculiar-looking drifting rock, the ship's crew retrieved the object, hoping to find something of value. The scavenger vessel happened to be on a route to Apokolips, the home of the now-powerful tyrant Darkseid, now empowered by the fabled Omega Force long after his first encounter with Doomsday. Doomsday was fully rested and, after slaughtering the crew of the salvage ship, found himself landing on the harsh world. This was to be the setup for a final showdown between Doomsday and Superman, who had been uneasy about the possibility of Doomsday's resurrection. With the help of his Justice League contacts, Superman procured a Mother Box, a sentient computer, after Darkseid's servant Desaad contacted Earth about a problem on Apokolips.

Unknown to Superman, Doomsday had faced and beaten Darkseid in single combat, even after withstanding the full effect of Darkseid's Omega Beams, and was laying waste to Apokolips. Before Superman could deal with Doomsday, Desaad opened a boom tube to Calaton – the first world where Doomsday was successfully defeated – and sent Doomsday through to what he believed was his defeat at the hands of the Radiant. Doomsday was able to adapt, however, and overcome any opponent because of the process by which he was created, so, although the Radiant had defeated him once, he would not be able to defeat him again. Likewise, even though Superman had killed Doomsday once before, he was unable to do so again. Superman, while knowing this – having learned Doomsday's history by the time-manipulating Waverider – was obsessed with stopping Doomsday and followed him to Calaton. He fought Doomsday again with the help of the Mother Box, but, despite it providing him with extra weapons such as an ultrasonic gun and an energy sword, Superman met with defeat as Doomsday's evolutions rendered him immune to Superman's attacks, such as his auditory channels being sealed by new bone growths or his knuckle-bones being able to shoot out of his body to 'pin' Superman in the air. Eventually, with his left arm having suffered a compound fracture and most of his weapons lost, Superman was forced to use one of Waverider's time travel devices to leave Doomsday stranded at the End of Time, where Doomsday met the one force he could not overcome: entropy. Upon returning Superman to the present, the Mother Box healed Superman's injuries and then "died". On Apokolips, Darkseid, despite being beaten to near-death by Doomsday, became fascinated with him after witnessing his abilities first-hand and learning his origin from Waverider.

The Doomsday Wars 
Doomsday returned yet again in the miniseries The Doomsday Wars. In this series, Prin Vnok, an underling of Brainiac, uses his technology to travel to the End of Time to retrieve Doomsday to combine the beast's massive power with Brainiac's formidable intellect after Brainiac's original body was badly injured in his last fight with Superman (this was explained as having taken place at the time of the timeline's reconstruction following the events of "Zero Hour"; the reconstruction of time meant that Brainiac was able to change the events of Doomsday's defeat). He was unable to erase Doomsday's consciousness with drugs, however, because he reacted too fast for the process to work. With Doomsday's strength of will too strong for Brainiac to permanently overwhelm him on his own, Brainiac instead chose to use a human host to genetically engineer a Doomsday clone without the mind of the original, while temporarily lodging in Doomsday's head to use the creature's strength until he would be forced out. He chose to use Pete Ross and Lana Lang's newborn baby, born eight weeks premature and transported by Superman to a hospital. Brainiac intercepted Superman and stole the baby to hurt his long-time foe, correctly deducing that it was the child of someone close to Superman and feeling that the baby's still-malleable DNA would make him ideal for the plan. In the end, Superman thwarted Brainiac's plot by driving him out of Doomsday's body via the use of a telepathy-blocking "psi-blocker", simultaneously rescuing the baby from Brainiac's equipment after his foe's treatments brought the child to full-term before infusing him with Doomsday's DNA. He then lured Doomsday to the moon, where he placed him in a kind of stasis with four Justice League teleporters. Perpetually transporting between those four booths, Doomsday would never be more than 25% integrated, and was thus unable to escape.

Our Worlds at War 
Following these events, Doomsday was released by Manchester Black's Suicide Squad to battle Imperiex, a threat judged to be greater than Doomsday himself. Once freed, Doomsday slaughtered the Squad, then went on to battle Imperiex's numerous probes (his mind having been altered by Black to regard them as the threat he normally perceived Superman to be), which had thus far managed to seriously injure or kill most of Earth's heroes. Doomsday tore through numerous probes with seemingly little effort, while aided by Superman – the only time the two enemies would come close to teaming up – before finally confronting Imperiex. Imperiex proved too much for Doomsday – he blasted the creature, reducing him to a glowing skeleton.

Sentience 
Superman (vol. 2) #175 commemorated the 100th issue since the death of Superman in battle with Doomsday, by staging a rematch. Doomsday's skeleton was retrieved and his flesh regrown by Lex Luthor using Superman's Kryptonian DNA, who gave Doomsday to Darkseid to repay Earth's war debt to Apokolips (Darkseid sought to control Doomsday since their last encounter). By this time, Doomsday had evolved intelligence and sentience. Luthor arranged for the Joker to set Doomsday loose in Washington, D.C., to demonstrate that he was "in good working condition". It also happened to be the anniversary of the day that Superman had died while stopping Doomsday. Despite being weakened by kryptonite exposure when Luthor attempted to exploit Doomsday's Kryptonian origins, Superman's heart was restarted by Black Lightning and he reached Doomsday just as the monster was struggling with the Martian Manhunter. Learning from J'onzz that Doomsday wanted to kill Luthor because he blamed Luthor for his "death" in the Imperiex War, Superman would soon fight Doomsday again and, this time, humbly defeat the creature by knocking him out and proving to himself and the world that Doomsday would never again be Superman's equal:

You're different now. You can think for yourself. So think about this. Before, you were a mindless thing. Nothing could hurt you. You couldn't feel pain, much less understand it. But once you have felt it—it changes you—forever. And you'll begin to understand something new. Fear. I've lived with it all my life. You don't want to die again, do you? The agony of what's happened to you affects your speed—your strength...and that little bit of doubt—that you cannot win today—grows. You understand now, don't you? You will never hurt me again. You will never kill me again. Never again!

Darkseid attempted to replicate Doomsday, producing an army of Doomsday "clones". Darkseid was unable to duplicate perfectly the creature in all its raw power but still used the replicates as his foot soldiers, typically for diversions or intimidations. They were defeated by a combination of heat vision and Batman's explosive batarangs during an attack on Paradise Island, while Darkseid kidnapped the newly arrived Kara Zor-El/Supergirl.

When Superman traveled to Apokolips to reclaim the life of Steel, Mortalla (Darkseid's wife) ordered his troops to release Doomsday to help Darkseid. Doomsday's short freedom was quickly halted by Steel in the Entropy Aegis, an armor with incredible power that had been built out of the remains of an Imperiex probe. Doomsday disappeared and was seen wandering the harsh lands of Apokolips.

With his newfound intelligence, Doomsday managed to escape Apokolips and return to Earth. Upon his arrival, Doomsday encountered a series of emotions previously alien to him: love, compassion, and kindness. Exploring the full range of these new emotions, Doomsday made his way to Metropolis once more, though not in the destructive manner he had before. Upon his arrival in Metropolis, Doomsday found Superman at the brink of death at the hands of Gog and intervened to help Superman in an ultimately futile fight against Gog's army.

In a new future, Doomsday was remembered as one of Earth's greatest heroes, who continued Superman's legacy by leading an army under his name against the army of Gog. This new timeline ended when it was revealed that Superman was still alive, trapped and tortured with kryptonite for two centuries by Gog. Ultimately, Superman managed to convince Gog of the error of his ways. Gog offered to correct the past by returning Doomsday to an earlier point in the timeline but, in the process, Doomsday would lose his intelligence and humanity. Returned to the present, an unconscious Doomsday was transported away by a younger version of Gog to an unknown location for an unknown purpose.

Infinite Crisis 
During Infinite Crisis, Doomsday was freed from captivity in a cavern near the center of the Earth by Doctor Psycho and Warp. Doctor Psycho mind-controlled him and used him as the "spear-carrier" of a super villain assault on Metropolis. As he came into full view in front of Green Arrow, he was stopped by Kal-El and Kal-L, who made quick work of the villain as, for the first time since the Crisis on Infinite Earths, the two Supermen acted as a team.

New Krypton 

Doomsday returned in the final page of Superman #681, crashing in Metropolis shortly after the representatives of Kandor met with the President. Doomsday was then apparently killed on Earth's moon when Superman, Supergirl, and many of Kandor's inhabitants jumped him to death in Action Comics #871, crushing the monster's skull.

After the fight, Doomsday's mangled corpse ended up in the hands of General Sam Lane, who was in charge of a mysterious government agency determined to halt the Kryptonian "invasion" of Earth. It has been hinted at that General Lane sent Doomsday after the Kandorians in the first place, and the creature is only one of the "weapons" at Lane's disposal. General Lane put Lex Luthor to work on apparently "improving" Doomsday who, by the end of New Krypton, had still not awoken from his most recent death.

During the fight, Zor-El (Superman's uncle) told him that Doomsday was created by Kryptonians on ancient Krypton through "forced evolution" and, as a result, the creature hates all Kryptonians.

Reign of Doomsday 

Doomsday returned to carve a new path of destruction throughout the DC Universe. His journey started in the Steel one-shot and continued into Outsiders (vol. 4) #37, Justice League of America (vol. 2) #55, Superman/Batman Annual #5, Superboy (vol. 4) #6 and into the milestone Action Comics #900. Doomsday, exhibiting an increased, broadened power set which seemed to adapt to each of his opponents, attacked, defeated and abducted Steel, the Cyborg Superman, the Eradicator, Supergirl, and Superboy, before taking them to a cloaked satellite at the former location of New Krypton. Superman discovered that this was all part of a plot by Lex Luthor. After locating the satellite, Superman attempted to free his allies, only for them all to discover the apparently still-inert body of Doomsday, as well as three separate clones, each with a different power set.

Attempting to flee from the clones with Doomsday, the Superman Family discovered that their ship was on course for Earth with the potential to trigger an extinction-level event if it were to strike. Their attempt to divert the ship was interrupted by a being called "Doomslayer", who resembled a cyborg version of Doomsday and was later revealed to be a Doomsday who was tossed down an infinite tube that gave it time to evolve. Doomslayer effortlessly tore Eradicator apart and proclaimed that Earth must die for the future.

Doomslayer believed the original Doomsday to be an infection, so it planned to destroy Earth, as it considered Earth to be ground zero for Doomsday's "infection". Superman and his friends escaped the ship with the original Doomsday and stopped the ship from crashing onto Earth, pushing it into Metropolis's bay. Afterward, Doomslayer attacked the city with the Doomsday clones, determined to erase all trace and knowledge of Doomsday from existence. The clones spread across the world, wreaking havoc, while Doomslayer's second plan was to entice the Doomsdays to reach the Earth's core so that he could expand the universe inside the ship's tower and destroy the planet from within, thus erasing all knowledge of Doomsday from the universe.

In S.T.A.R. Labs, Superman's allies used the original Doomsday's body to try to find a way to stop the Doomsday clones. Doomsday awakened, but Eradicator (who was thought to be killed by Doomslayer) was in control. As Eradicator and the heroes attacked the Doomsday clones, he warned that Doomsday's mind was beginning to awaken. In the final battle, a weakened Superman made contact with the ship's artificial intelligence before it reached Earth's core, hoping to have the tower teleport away. Meanwhile, the Doomsday clones were defeated by Earth's heroes and sent back into the pit in which the tower was located. Eradicator arrived and defended Superman, now very weak, from Doomslayer, quickly throwing Superman out of the tower and allowing himself to be trapped with Doomslayer before the tower teleported away.

The New 52 

In The New 52 (a 2011 reboot of the DC Comics universe), Doomsday made his official debut in September 2013 as a part of "Villains Month". In Batman/Superman #3.1 Doomsday attacked Krypton many years ago when Lara was a lieutenant in the elite military seminary. Colonel Zod faced him wearing an ancient armor of Krypton's warrior founders but their battle caused the death of thousands of Kryptonians. Zod apparently defeated Doomsday, sending him to the Phantom Zone. Years later, General Zod, now also imprisoned in the Phantom Zone, communicated with the child Kara Zor-El, telling her how he admired the creature because it destroyed everything, an attribute he sought for his people to be strong as years of complacency had made the Kryptonians weak. Zor-El narrated a prophecy in which the last knight of the House of El will travel to a distant planet after the destruction of Krypton. The last knight will be found by Doomsday later and will battle him to save his people, sacrificing his own life to do so.

In Superman/Wonder Woman, Doomsday mysteriously appears in the North Atlantic Ocean and fights Wonder Woman, breaking her arm before vanishing. After describing her attacker to Superman, both travel to the Fortress of Solitude where Diana identifies Doomsday on a Phantom Zone viewing device. Superman assumes that the walls of the Phantom Zone are failing, which has allowed the momentary escapes for Doomsday.

Months later, the creature once again escapes the Phantom Zone to wreak havoc across the globe, changing into an even deadlier form; now, every living thing in its vicinity dies, and even physical structures crumble. Superman, Wonder Woman, Steel, and the Justice League struggle to defeat it, even calling on the aid of Lex Luthor; in the end, Superman drags Doomsday's body to the planet Venus and incinerates it. Believing Doomsday dead, Superman returns to Earth, only to watch in horror as the creature teleports there. Finally realizing he has no choice, Superman kills Doomsday, slicing the monster in half and, as it disintegrates, inhaling its ash-like remains to contain them within his indestructible body. However, soon after, he starts to change, mentally showing signs of exacerbated stress and aggression, and gradually physically as well, resembling Doomsday more and more. It is revealed that Doomsday was released by the Phantom King (Xa-Du), on instigation of Brainiac; the latter orchestrated it to get rid of Superman as he prepared to assimilate the consciousnesses of all human beings in the world. Superman managed to take control of the raging power and fury of Doomsday for long enough, however, to attack and defeat Brainiac's gigantic mother ship, dragging it into a black hole, ridding himself of the Doomsday infection in the process.

DC Rebirth 
In DC Rebirth, after the death of the New 52 Superman, the pre-Flashpoint Superman appears to confront Lex Luthor as he attempts to proclaim his new role as Metropolis's protector in the absence of the Man of Steel, but their fight is interrupted when Doomsday emerges from a coffin that was being transported by an unidentified group in a hovercar above them. As Superman and Lex attempt to fight the creature, Superman is troubled to realize that this Doomsday operates at a strength level similar to the creature he faced for the first time in his world, but also has some degree of strategic planning, attacking passing trains and civilians to distract Superman and Luthor. As Wonder Woman appears to assist, Doomsday departs, but Superman and Wonder Woman are able to intercept him before he reaches Superman's wife, Lois, and their son Jon. While Wonder Woman takes Lois and Jon to the JLA Watchtower for safety, Superman is confused when an unknown group appears and attacks Doomsday, but they are swiftly defeated. He subsequently manages to lure Doomsday to his own makeshift Fortress. Lois and Jon plea to Diana to help Clark when he struggles in containing him and she soon joins the battle again. This allows Clark time to use the Phantom Zone projector to trap his foe, but he is unaware that the unknown group led by Mr. Oz intercepted the Phantom Zone beam and have captured Doomsday for their own unknown purposes.

After the merging of the timelines of both pre and post-Flashpoint Superman in "Superman Reborn", Doomsday had become smarter and escaped from his confinement when Tim Drake, who had also been imprisoned by Mr. Oz, opened all the cells to escape. Tim Drake from the "Titans Tomorrow" timeline, who had also been imprisoned there, came to his rescue and stunned Doomsday several times with rounds of Kryptonite ammunition. Unable to take him down, he tricked him into re-entering his cell by chasing a hologram of Superman.

Powers and abilities 

Doomsday developed in one of the harshest habitats in all of existence: prehistoric Krypton. Through cloning technology, the infant continually returned to life and evolved, becoming resistant or immune to whatever killed him before, ultimately permanently acquiring the capability to regenerate and evolve without technology. After the Radiant killed him the first time they fought, Doomsday grew immune to the Radiant's energy-projection and even managed to withstand Darkseid's full Omega-Effect. The amount of damage dealt to Doomsday determined the length of time it took for him to fully recover. During his outwardly undamaged death at Superman's hands, he only needed some days to recover, but when Imperiex reduced him to a skeleton, it took months. His entombment in a Calatonian burial suit and metal vault lasted hundreds of millennia. After being killed by the Radiant and subsequently undergoing the impact of the casket on Earth, his body was sealed underground in total darkness. Deprived of solar energy, necessary to nourish his Kryptonian anatomy, he could only revive extremely slowly and naturally.

Doomsday had a highly accelerated healing factor that allowed him to quickly regenerate from most damage. When his side was cut by Superman with a plasma sword, it closed within moments. As a result of his engineering, Doomsday did not need to eat, drink, breathe, or sleep, and his body was almost solid mass with no internal organs, the masses of bone like material covering his body likely acting as some form of exoskeleton.

Resistance 
Doomsday also was able to develop/evolve resistance from ordinary injuries. Superman once used a sound gun to greatly discomfort him, but Doomsday's auditory canals closed up, making him impervious to Superman's weapon. Waverider once paralyzed Doomsday with energy while seeking to perceive Doomsday's presence, but the second attempt backfired as Doomsday triggered a feedback burst that briefly disrupted Waverider.

In essence, Doomsday gradually became more invulnerable if not injured beyond his ability to recover, which has so far been undefined. Doomsday developed weapons and abilities that countered the powers of an opponent. He managed to cancel out the pure-energy Radiant by slamming into him while generating a dark counter-energy; to greatly extend his claws and develop a poison to strike Superman in flight and reel him in; to breathe flames against the fire-sensitive Martian Manhunter, and apparently neutralize his defensive phase-shifting power. Doomsday's skeleton protruded through his skin in razor-sharp spurs, which provided protection to his few vital organs (brain, eyes and nervous system), and acted as claw-like weapons on his hands, elbows, and knees. In addition, the tips of these protrusions are lethally poisonous even to powerful Apokoliptians like Darkseid.

Doomsday was immensely resistant to heat, cold, and conventional damage, allowing him to survive in the most inhospitable worlds, or in the vacuum of space. His superhuman endurance and invulnerability were able to withstand Darkseid's full-powered "Omega Effect" without any apparent damage. This is an immunity he shares with Superman, being as he is technically Kryptonian.

Waverider's words suggest that Doomsday's body could have been completely destroyed after his battle with the Radiant, suggesting that his healing factor has its limits, but at this point Doomsday was left so damaged that he remained 'comatose' for several thousand years while trapped and cut off from the solar energy he required to sustain himself. After his subsequent evolutions, it is unlikely that anything is capable of doing sufficient damage to him to bring him to this state again.

Strength 
Doomsday possessed enormous superhuman strength that is significantly greater than Superman and at one point this enabled him to effortlessly stand his ground against the entire Justice League, including Superman and Orion. He was able to break Superman's left arm with limited effort, as well as outmatch and beat Darkseid unconscious in combat. However, his strength has limits: the immensely strong Calatonian alloy cables, in which he was entombed, continued to partially restrain him during his initial rampage on Earth, with the last of the cables only being destroyed when the Justice League unleashed a full-power assault to try and stop him. It was never stated how long he had struggled to free his left hand before his escape.

Doomsday possessed seemingly inexhaustible stamina, and was not noticeably slowed down from fighting Superman for an entire day. His speed and agility were vastly disproportionate to his bulky stature, and he was able to match Superman in this regard, once even managing to grab the Flash while the hero was in motion. He could not fly, but traveled by leaping miles at a time. Superman took advantage of this in their first battle by trying to keep him airborne by flying into the sky.

After being regrown by Lex Luthor, Doomsday was genetically part-Kryptonian due to his genes having been spliced with Kal-El's. However, with the exception of his flame-breath, he displayed no additional abilities. In fact, he was shown to be weaker than previously when he was single-handedly beaten by Superman. This was attributed to intelligence that he developed, causing him to fear the death that awaited him if he lost, but did not explain how a simple minor concussion could incapacitate his healing factor for the time he remained unconscious. He apparently lost his intelligence when he was sent back in time, reverting him to his original state of fearlessness.

Once he gained some of Superman's Kryptonian DNA, he became susceptible to kryptonite. Unlike Superman, it caused him pain, but could not kill him. This rendered him controllable, but given his ability to adapt, this may not be permanent – it is unknown if he must first die and resurrect in order to gain immunity to something.

Other powers 
During his confrontation with Steel, Doomsday spontaneously developed the power of flight, and the ability to cover his body with metallic armor, capable of resisting even Steel's paralyzing nanites. In a later confrontation with the Outsiders, as he sought to confront the Eradicator, he demonstrated the ability to absorb energy from Looker and Halo's attacks and send it back to them in a massive burst manipulating raw power like the Eradicator. During his battle with the Cyborg-Superman, the Cyborg tore through portions of Doomsday's body, which were quickly replaced with bionic parts of his own, giving itself vast technopathy. When confronting Superboy, the monster showcased a blue glow in its eyes, indicating Tactile Telekinesis power even greater than his own, but it has since been revealed that these Doomsdays were actually clones of the original, each specifically designed to take out Steel, Henshaw, Eradicator and Superboy, putting them at a disadvantage when pitted against the other Supermen.

In the DCU revamp, Doomsday was revealed to grow and evolve in stages since its genesis. Growing as well as gaining in biomass and power over the course of its own development cycle, it was soon revealed that when it killed Superman post-reboot, it was only in its larval stage. While undergoing its adolescence phase, the monster created a giant clump of its own biomass as a makeshift cocoon, which steadily built up its physiological structure to its current state by feeding on the natural wildlife around it. Whence it hatched from its incubator, Doomsday became only that much greater an extinction level threat, now able to move to and from the phantom zone at will, using it as a hub for spontaneous teleportation. This was made possible due to its physical strength being vastly augmented to the point it could breach the dimensional barrier through physical force alone. He'd grown so powerful in such a short amount of time that the creature could overpower the demigoddess Diana of Themyscira in a straight forward battle with ease, going so far as to break both of her arms.

Doomsday was still in the stages of his evolution, to help it along he developed a form of death aura which sapped the life out of anything and everything around him within a couple hundred yards. Growing more and more powerful the more he killed and the more lifeforce he consumed, an extension of this power was a toxic spore cloud he emitted from his own body which expedited the leeching process. Doomsday's deadly miasma had the effect of making everything around him wither and die at an accelerated rate; such as sand glossing over into black onyx, sentient life burst into flames several meters away, even buildings spontaneously dissolving at a molecular level upon exposure to his poisonous fugue. Even a solar powered Kryptonian couldn't stand to be in his presence for more than a few minutes at a time. The virulent also has the effect of turning anyone and everyone affected by it into an iteration of Doomsday himself. Moreover, those who kill him become a receptacle for his essential self, taking on his more vicious and bloodthirsty characteristics as well as his powers.

Other versions 
 In the non-continuity book All-Star Superman, Grant Morrison's modern take on the Silver Age includes the D.N.A. P.R.O.J.E.C.T., which is resurrected by a scientist named Leo Quintum. Under Quintum's guidance, the P.R.O.J.E.C.T. was dedicated to "the engineering of new human forms" including Bizarro worker drones, giants called "Voyager Titans" who could travel through space under their own power, and microscopic "nanonauts" who could unlock the mysteries of the sub-atomic world. The P.R.O.J.E.C.T.'s ultimate goal was to create a replacement Superman, in case something were to happen to the original. In All-Star Superman #4, it was revealed that the P.R.O.J.E.C.T. (with support from the U.S. Army's Cadmus Division) created a formula to bestow Superman-level strength and durability on a normal human, but all of their test subjects ultimately burned out. Jimmy Olsen shot himself with a syringe gun containing a formula marked "Do Not Open Until Doomsday", and transformed into a hulking, gray-skinned figure with bony protrusions. He succeeded in stopping a black kryptonite-afflicted Superman and transformed back into his normal form before the formula had a chance to kill him. It is not discussed as to whether Superman fought an original Doomsday in this universe.
 During the "Lifeline" storyline that ran in Wonder Woman, an imperfect duplicate of Doomsday was created by an artificial intelligence based on the son of scientist Doctor Julian Lazarus, but was destroyed when Wonder Woman's allies were able to feed the clone so much power that its bones covered it and it reverted to a statue-like state that she could shatter with relative ease.
 In an attempt to understand death and poking fun at the Death of Superman, Mister Mxyzptlk created a temporary copy of Doomsday, which he called "Bada-Bing-Bada-Boomsday", although he erased it once again after it temporarily killed him. This version had light yellow skin instead of the gray tinge of the mainstream version, in addition to more spikes. This issue was known as "The Death of Mr. Mxyzptlk".
 In the Tangent Universe, Doomsday was a member of the Doom Patrol.
 In JLA/Avengers #4 Doomsday was shown in a panel near the end of the heroes' battle against Krona's enthralled army of villains, where he was apparently defeated by Thor.
 In the Young Justice crossover story "World Without Young Justice", the past of all of the team members was changed. Superboy was now one of two clone attempts after Superman's death. His nemesis was a teenage version of Doomsday known as "Doomsboy".
 In Action Comics #856, a Bizarro No. 1 created a "Bizarro Doomsday".
 In the Superboy story "Hypertension", Black Zero had a collection of dozens of Doomsdays from alternate realities.
 In Superman: Red Son, Doomsday was one of the many rogues created by Dr. Luthor.
 A Doomsday-like creature codenamed "All-American Boy", was introduced in the Superman/Batman storyline "The Search for Kryptonite". All-American Boy was an experiment to use kryptonite to bond cell scrapings taken from Doomsday to a human host (Joshua Walker). Walker, a local Smallville hero turned soldier, under mind control battled Superman, devastating Smallville, Kansas, in the process. Batman located Josh's parents, who convinced him to stop, and he regained consciousness. Project leader Amanda Waller was forced to contribute towards the repairs of Smallville in return for her dealings in the AAB project to remain secret.
 In the Superman/Batman storyline "Mash-Up", elements of Doomsday were combined with parts of Deathstroke, creating the villain "Doomstroke".
 In the alternate timeline of the Flashpoint event, Doomsday was part of the military's "Project Six". After being discovered lying dormant in an underground vault, Project Six's DNA was used by the government's Sam Lane to create supersoldiers. The volunteer supersoldier was Neil Sinclair. Later, Project Six, controlled by General Nathaniel Adam via a mental interface, was sent to attack Booster Gold, who was believed to be an Atlantean threat. During the battle, Adam's control device was disrupted by a Metahuman woman named Alexandra Gianopoulos, which caused Project Six's true personality to surface. Project Six attacked and nearly beat Booster Gold to death, with Booster only survived because Project Six was at a more basic level of evolution than the Doomsday with which Booster was familiar. With the immediate threat defeated, Project Six began to rampage, killing innocent people, but after regaining consciousness, Booster Gold put Project Six's helmet back on, returning control back to General Adam. However, the General, believing that Project Six was naturally mindless and incapable of doing anything without being under the control of something else, attributed its rampage to Booster, commanding Project Six to capture him. When General Adam attempted to have Booster Gold subjected to mind-crippling interrogation due to his disbelief of Booster's story, Booster Gold shot down a girder, knocking the control helmet off him. At the same time, an image of "Project Superman" appeared on a computer screen. The two events caused Project Six's true personality to resurface again. As Project Six rampaged, badly beating Booster Gold, Alexandra put on the control helmet, forcing him to rip open his own chest, killing himself.
 In the DC Bombshells continuity, Faora injects herself with Raven's blood from when Raven transformed into an unstable demonic monster after her father's death, altering her body to turn herself into this dimension's version of Doomsday.

In other media

Television

Live-action 
 Doomsday appears in the eighth season of Smallville, performed by Dario Delacio. This version was created on Krypton via its strongest creatures' DNA to serve as General Zod's and Faora's "son" and kill Kal-El. Its genetic material became attached to the young Kal-El's spaceship and traveled to Earth, where it befriended Lex Luthor and was given up for adoption in 1989. Receiving the name "Davis Bloome" (portrayed by Sam Witwer), he went on to become a paramedic and fall in love with Chloe Sullivan before recognizing Clark Kent as Kal-El, which causes him to mutate into a monstrous form and suffer periodic blackouts for the duration of his transformations. Throughout the season, Bloome struggles to maintain control over Doomsday until Sullivan uses black kryptonite to separate them, allowing Kent to trap Doomsday deep underground. However, Bloome realizes Sullivan was only with him to protect Kent and was still in love with Jimmy Olsen. In retaliation, Bloome fatally wounds Olsen, who kills Bloome in turn before succumbing to his injuries. Witwer's contract allowed him the chance to return in the ninth season, with the plan being for him to act as "Major Zod", a clone of previously-established villain General Zod, Faora having previously described Bloome as resembling his "father". Although Witwer considered his time on the series enjoyable and he was flattered by the offer, he ultimately declined as he felt it would be difficult for both the characters and audience to accept.
 Doomsday appears in Krypton, portrayed by Staz Nair. This version was originally Dax-Baron, a Kandorian with a unique genetic mutation who was convinced he will be the one to end a Kryptonian civil war. To this end, he allowed Kryptonian scientists Wedna-El and Van-Zod to experiment on him until he became Doomsday through reactive evolution. Doomsday was put into cryo-stasis, but is eventually freed in the present by Seg-El, who seeks his power to stop Brainiac despite Adam Strange's pleas and knowledge of what Doomsday will go on to do by his time. General Zod eventually captures Doomsday with the intention of using him to as a weapon in his campaign to colonize other planets before sending him to Krypton's moon Wegthor to defeat a rebel movement against Zod. While Doomsday is presumed dead during Wegthor's destruction, he is later found in a frozen meteorite.

Animation 
 Doomsday appears in series set in the DC Animated Universe (DCAU), voiced by Michael Jai White. This version is an altered clone of Superman genetically engineered by Project Cadmus to serve as the former's superior and indoctrinated with hatred. When he grew too difficult to control, Cadmus abandoned the project and launched Doomsday into space, but he damaged the rocket before he could leave Earth's orbit and crash-landed.
 Doomsday was considered to make an appearance in Superman: The Animated Series, but writer Paul Dini refused to include him.
 Doomsday appears in the Justice League two-part episode "A Better World". After crash-landing on Earth, he battles the Justice Lords, who arrived from their native universe to impose their will on a new Earth, until their version of Superman lobotomizes him.
 As of the Justice League Unlimited episode "The Doomsday Sanction", Cadmus extracted Doomsday, whose brain had regenerated, and held him in their custody until disgraced Cadmus member Achilles Milo released Doomsday to kill his superior Amanda Waller. However, Doomsday kills Milo instead and escapes to fight Superman. Following a grueling fight, Superman eventually encases Doomsday in lava in the hopes of interrogating him about Cadmus. When this fails, the former imprisons him in the Phantom Zone.
 Doomsday makes a cameo appearance in the Legion of Super Heroes episode "Phantoms" as a prisoner of the Phantom Zone.
 Doomsday appears in Teen Titans Go!, voiced by Asher Bishop. This version is childish and wants to be friends with the Teen Titans.

Film

Live-action 
 Doomsday was considered to appear in Superman Reborn and Superman Lives before they were scrapped.
 Doomsday appears in The Death and Return of Superman, portrayed by Elden Henson.
 Doomsday appears in the DC Extended Universe (DCEU) film Batman v Superman: Dawn of Justice, voiced and motion-captured by Robin Atkin Downes, with Gary A. Hecker providing additional voice work. This version was created by Lex Luthor using his blood and the body of General Zod to recreate a monster detailed in the files of a crashed Kryptonian scout ship known as "desecration without name". Once it hatches, Luthor names the creature "Doomsday" and sends it to kill Superman. While it is defeated by Superman, Batman, and Wonder Woman, Doomsday impales Superman before it dies. Additionally, director Zack Snyder confirmed via his Vero account that a previous Doomsday had been created millennia prior.
 Doomsday makes a cameo appearance in the (DCEU) film Zack Snyder's Justice League via archive footage.

Animation 
 Doomsday appears in Superman: Doomsday. This version is stated to be an improperly programmed biomechanical supersoldier and a literal doomsday device that was incapable of distinguishing friend from foe, destroying everything in its path because it must. After being unearthed by LexCorp, Doomsday goes on a rampage before fighting and eventually being killed by Superman.
 An army of Doomsday clones appear in Superman/Batman: Apocalypse. Darkseid creates them to attack Themyscira, but they prove significantly weaker than the original. While Superman defeats them easily, he and the other heroes involved realize the clones were used as a distraction so Darkseid could kill Lyla and kidnap Kara Zor-El.
 Doomsday appears in the DC Animated Movie Universe (DCAMU) film The Death of Superman. After arriving on Earth via a Boom Tube, Doomsday goes on a rampage, overpowering the Justice League and Lex Luthor until Superman eventually tricks Doomsday into killing itself. Afterwards, S.T.A.R. Labs acquires Doomsday's body. It is later revealed in the sequel Reign of the Supermen that Doomsday is an Apokoliptian biological weapon created by Darkseid to kill Superman in preparation for an Apokoliptian invasion.
 An army of monsters based on Doomsday and Parademons called Paradooms appear in the DCAMU film Justice League Dark: Apokolips War.
 An illusion of Doomsday makes a cameo appearance in Injustice.

Video games 
 Doomsday appears as a boss in The Death and Return of Superman.
 A Doomsday clone serving under Brainiac appears in Justice League Heroes, voiced by Charles Gideon Davis.
 Doomsday appears in DC Universe Online, voiced by Benjamin Jansen. Additionally, LexCorp conducted experiments on Smallville's citizens via Doomsday's DNA, turning them into Doomsday-like creatures, while a modernized Doomsday carrying a spore plague appears in a later episode.
 Doomsday appears as a playable character in Injustice: Gods Among Us, voiced by Khary Payton. In its arcade mode ending, Doomsday uses the Fortress of Solitude's technology to terraform Earth, making it resemble prehistoric Krypton, before eventually leaving Earth to fight Lobo.
 Doomsday appears as a playable character in Lego Batman 3: Beyond Gotham, voiced by Travis Willingham.
 Doomsday appears as a playable character in Infinite Crisis, voiced by Fred Tatasciore.
 Doomsday appears as a playable character in DC Unchained.
 Doomsday appears as an unlockable character in Lego DC Super Villains, voiced again by Fred Tatasciore.

Miscellaneous 
The Injustice incarnation of Doomsday appears in Injustice: Gods Among Us prequel comic. The Joker infects Superman with Scarecrow's fear toxin, causing Superman to hallucinate a pregnant Lois Lane as Doomsday and fly her into outer space. When she died, a nuclear bomb that the Joker tied to her heartbeat detonated in Metropolis. Sometime later, Superman brings the real Doomsday under his control via a harness that limits the latter's ability to act independently.

Merchandise 
 An exclusive Doomsday figure was released in a six-pack as part of the Justice League Unlimited tie-in toy line.
 Mattel released a Doomsday figure based on his appearance in Superman: Doomsday.
 DC Collectibles released a Doomsday figure in a two-pack with Catwoman, based on his appearance in the video game Injustice: Gods Among Us.
 DC Direct released a Doomsday figure.
 Mattel released a Doomsday figure in their DC Super Heroes line.
 Soap Studio released a Mirage 3D figurine of Doomsday in their Batman v Superman: Dawn of Justice line.

See also 
 List of Superman enemies

References

Works cited

External links 
 Doomsday at Comic Vine
 Doomsday at Superhero Database

Characters created by Jerry Ordway
Characters created by Roger Stern
Characters created by Dan Jurgens
Clone characters in comics
Comics characters introduced in 1992
DC Comics aliens
DC Comics demons
DC Comics characters who can move at superhuman speeds
DC Comics characters with accelerated healing
DC Comics characters with superhuman senses
DC Comics characters with superhuman strength
DC Comics deities
DC Comics extraterrestrial supervillains
DC Comics film characters
DC Comics male supervillains
DC Comics titles
Fictional characters from Kansas
Fictional characters with death or rebirth abilities
Fictional characters with immortality
Fictional characters with superhuman durability or invulnerability
Fictional rampage and spree killers
Fictional genetically engineered characters
Fictional mass murderers
Fictional monsters
Fictional paramedics
Fictional soldiers
Fighting game characters
Superhero television characters
Kryptonians
Science fiction weapons
Video game bosses
Weapons of mass destruction in fiction
Superman characters

de:Schurken im Superman-Universum#Doomsday